Háj ve Slezsku is a municipality and village in Opava District in the Moravian-Silesian Region of the Czech Republic. It has about 3,200 inhabitants.

Administrative parts
Villages of Chabičov, Jilešovice, Lhota and Smolkov are administrative parts of Háj ve Slezsku.

Etymology
The name of the municipality means "grove in Silesia".

Geography
It lies on the right bank of the Opava River, which forms the northern municipal border. The northern part of the municipality is located in the Opava Hilly Land, the southern part is located in the Nízký Jeseník mountain range.

History
First settlements in the area were probably established in the 13th century. The first written mention of Chabičov and Smolkov is from 1377. The youngest village is Háj, which was established in 1784 as a part of Chabičov. It was its administrative part until 1922. By the unification of Chabičov, Háj and Smolkov, it officially became an independent municipality, and the three villages became administrative parts. Since 1970 the municipality is called Háj ve Slezsku. Jilešovice and Lhota were incorporated in 1979.

Culture
For several years the municipality has celebrated its citizens and people from surrounding areas in an annual festival called Rozmarné léto, named after the most famous novel by local native Vladislav Vančura.

Notable people
Vladislav Vančura (1891–1942), writer

Gallery

References

External links

Villages in Opava District